The Arte della Lana was the wool guild of Florence during the Late Middle Ages and in the Renaissance. It was one of the seven Arti Maggiori ("greater trades") of Florence, separate from the Arti Minori (the "lesser trades") and the Arti Mediane (the "middle trades"). The Arte della Lana dealt in woollen cloth and cooperated with the other corporations of bankers and merchants in administering the commune, both under the podestà and the Republic of Florence. The powerful Albizzi family were prominent members of the guild.

History 
At the height of the industry the Arte della Lana directly employed 30.000 workers and indirectly about a third of Florence's population, and produced 100,000 lengths of cloth annually. The Arte della Lana saw all the processes from the raw baled wool through the final cloth, woven at numerous looms scattered in domiciles throughout the city. Like other guilds, the Arte served only to coordinate the activities of its own members, who did not generally own the means of production or directly manage the  processes. Its syndics ensured that quality standards were met and contracts were honored.

The predecessor and, until the mid-14th century the rival of the Arte della Lana, was the powerful Arte di Calimala, a corporation of importers of raw cloth, who dyed and finished it.

The guildhall, the Palazzo dell’ Arte della Lana, was completed in 1308, with an attached fortifiable tower-house. From its interior, where some 14th-century frescoes remain, a gallery designed by Bernardo Buontalenti links the palazzo with the church of Orsanmichele. The palazzo is now the seat of the Società Dantesca.

Citations

Other references

Further reading
Gualchiere, 2001.L'arte della lana a Firenze, (Florence: Edifir)  
H. Hoshino, 1980. L'arte della lana in Firenze nel Basso Medioevo: il commercio della lana e il mercato dei panni fiorentini nei secoli XIII-XV, (Florence: Leo S. Olschki)

Guilds of Florence
Woollen industry